The Makimuku ruins are ruins in Nara Prefecture Sakurai near Mount Miwa of the Yayoi Period.

It is designated as a national historic site .

It is an archaeological site that began in the 3rd century , and some researchers consider the area to be the birthplace of the Kofun system. There is a theory that they are the center of Yamatai country, and six ancient burial mounds such as Hashihaka Kofun are distributed.

Location and site outline 

The name of the Archaeological site comes from the village of Makimuku in the former Isogi-gun, and the village name "Makimuku" was taken from the "Makimuku Tamaki Palace" of Suinin and the "Makimuku Hijiro Palace" of  Emperor Keikō's "Tamaki Palace" and Emperor Hishiro Palace of Keikō, 

As of 2011, the area of the site is known as the Karasuda River in the north, the Gomihara River in the south, the Makinochi area bordering the Yamanobe Road in the east, and the Higashida area in the west, which covers an area of about 3 square kilometers. On the map of the site, the area of the site is centered on JR Makimuki Station and stretches about 2 km from east to west and about 1.5 km from north to south, forming an oval shape with an area of 3 square kilometers.

The terrain is high in the east and low in the west. The streams of Mount Miwa, Makimukyamata and Anashiyama join the Makimuku River, and archaeological sites are formed on its alluvial fan. It has been confirmed that there was damage caused by a mudslide during the Jomon period. Perhaps because of this, no yayoi period settlements or moats have been detected at the site. Only fragments of Dōtaku and two  have been found. A short distance to the south of the site, a large number of pottery shards dating to the middle and late Yayoi period have been excavated, as well as square moated tomb and pit dwelling. Also, many Yayoi period artifacts have been excavated from the southwest side. However, Yayoi earthenware of the late Kinai V style has been found in the northern lower layer of the north ditch and the gray clay layer of the site, and it is classified as "Garengi 1" in "Garengi chronology". Note that excavation, who was in charge of the Ishino Hironobu, assigned the calendar years 180 to 210 for "Garment 1".

The site is considered by some researchers to be the best candidate for the Kofun period, as it shows the transition from the Yayoi period to the Kofun period, and may be the site that proves the Yamatai Honshu Theory. In 2011, a part of another large building was found about 5 meters to the east of the large building ruins, and the building ruins may have been built in the late 3rd century or later.。

An Kibi-type ritual relic, the komon enban, has been excavated from the moat around the Ishizuka tumulus. At the end of the 4th century, after the peak, haniwa were excavated.

From the Asuka period to the Nara period, a city developed in this area and was called "Oichi". This is why the Hashihaka Tomb is referred to as "Oichi Tomb" in the Imperial Household Agency ruling. From the Nara period to the Heian period, the remains of wells, earthen defences and old river channels have been found. Pottery with ink-painted pottery and the word "Oichi" has also been found.

The remains were designated a national historic site on 17 October 2013 (Heisei 25) as the "Garou Site".。

Excavations 

The site of Garou was first introduced by Minoru Doi in 1937 as the "Ohta Site" in "Yamato Shi".。Before it was called by its present name, it was known to the academic world as the "Ota Site" and "Katsuyama Site", and was recognized by researchers as one of a group of small sites, and did not attract any particular attention。However, a plan to build prefectural housing and a primary school to promote the employment of coal mine leavers was brought up, which led to a preliminary survey by Archaeological Institute of Kashihara to carry out a preliminary survey. As a result, a canal-like structure with a width of 5m, a depth of 1m, and a total length of more than 200m was found, and local Man'yōshū researcher Yoshinobu Yoshioka and others suggested that it might be the remains of the Makimukugawa River, which appears in Man'yōshū.。From the remains of the river, special vessel bases were excavated, which have been found at the Kibi Tate Tsuki and Miyakizaka sites. After the fifteenth survey in 1977, the research was transferred from the Archaeological Institute of Kashihara to the Sakurai As of December 2008, only 5% of the site had been excavated.。

In 2009 (Heisei 21), several Buildings were detected, and it has become clear that the site seems to be part of a City surrounded by Fortifications.

On 17 September 2010, the Board of Education of Sakurai City, Nara Prefecture, announced that about 2,000 seeds of la peach were found in an oval-shaped "clay pit" (4.3 meters north-south, 2.2 meters east-west, 80 centimeters deep) dug in the 3rd century, about 4 meters south of the remains of a large building. Peach seeds were found. Peach seeds are used as offerings in ancient rituals and are often found in Yayoi period ruins, but this is the largest number of seeds unearthed in one place in Japan.。In 2011, more than six types of fish bones and scales were found at the site, including Madai, Horsefish, Mackerel and Common carp. They also announced that they had found over a thousand animal bones, including those of Wild boars, Deers and Ducks.

Main Detected Remains 
It is about 10 times larger than the Karako-Kagi site and larger than the Taga Castle site, which was a major military base in the Tohoku region.。There are also traces of urban planning throughout the site.

 Two huge linear waterways, 5m wide and 1m deep, revetted with sheet piles and known as the "North Ditch" and "South Ditch".

 South ditch: extends from the Makimuki River near the tip of the protruding part of the Hashihaka Tomb tomb in a northwesterly direction towards the present-day Garoshi Elementary School. The source of the water is the circumference moat of the Hashihaka Tomb. Behind the moat is the Kunizu Shrine, which reaches the present-day Makimuki River.
 North Ditch: extends from the former Anashi River in the north-east towards the south-west. The source of the water is the old Makimuki River.
 The confluence of the two ditches is located on the grounds of the Garou Elementary School, and is estimated to be 2,600m long. It connects with the Yamato River, which in turn connects to the distant open sea.

 Spring water was found at the bottom, and the interior is divided into three main layers. About 150 irregularly shaped circular pits with one side protruding, about 3m in diameter and 1.5m deep, were found.
 The remains of dugout pillar buildings and the remains of accompanying buildings (a building of the first half of the Kofun period with a floor space of about 23 m2 in 2×3 rooms, the remains of a collapsed house and wooden products with black lacquered arcs, a small house of 1×1 rooms and a total pillar building of 2×2 rooms and wooden products with black lacquered arcs, a stone monument of the former site of the Tamaki Palace in Tamaki, and the existence of a palace residence are suspected. In addition, 17 dugout pillar buildings were found.)
 Pit-house

 However, there were not many pit dwellings, and it is likely that the buildings were built on stilts.。

 V-shaped compartmental ditch with arcaded panels, earthworks and fence rows
 Remains of a water-conducting facility (possibly a palace drainage facility)
 Ritual site (a jasper jade, a cusp, a tubular jade, a small glass jade, and pottery from the second half of the 4th century were excavated from the traditional site of Emperor Keiko's palace in Anashi-Doyodo district)
 Iron-making site - Metalsmith site with Tsukushi-shaped blowpipe. It is estimated to date from the late 4th century, when iron was smelted in the Kinai region.
 Fences around the settlement.
 Ancient burial mounds scattered around the site (Garou Kofun Group)

There is also the possibility that many buried tombs, which cannot be seen above ground, are buried underground.

Main excavated artifacts 

 Earthenwares from the late Yayoi period to the early Kofun period were excavated, and the Yayoi potterys and Haji pottery. According to them, the five periods are Yayoi pottery style V (Garou 1), Shonai pottery (Garou 2, Garou 3 and Garou 4) and Nururu I (Garou 5). However, the dates are based on the C14 dating method, which may be more than 100 years old.
 Vermilion-painted chicken-shaped wooden product
 A wooden product known as an 'arc-shaped circular plate', with a design combining straight and curved lines, believed to have its origins in the Kibi region.
 Drawstring bag made of silk However, silk was not produced in the Kinai region until the 4th century.
 Tiled earthenware (Pottery fragments were excavated in 1996 (Heisei 8). Analyses of the composition of the clay components confirmed in 2001 that the pottery was unique in Japan, and that it was made using techniques from the Korean Peninsula.
 A miniature boat
 Wooden arrowheads
 Iwami-type shield-shaped wooden wares
 a large number of imported pottery (exotic pottery).

However, there is a lack of conclusive evidence to date the site, such as the absence of bronze mirrors, swords, jade beads and iron objects, so it is not possible to say definitively that this was the site of the Yamatai Kingdom.

Artifacts have been unearthed from all over Japan, but most of them were made in Ise Province, which is adjacent to Yamato Province and has had a close relationship with the country since ancient times. Ise Province, which was adjacent to Yamato Province and had close relations with Ise Bay, and Owari Province, which is located to the east across Ise Bay. In addition to the pottery brought in, there is a large amount of pottery that was made in Yamato but is said to have regional characteristics, and the proportion of such pottery is higher at Ritual-related sites (30% of all pottery excavated at many sites). In addition, although these exotic pottery and artifacts are found from Kyushu to Kanto and the Sea of Japan side, there is very little pottery of Kyushu or Korean origin, suggesting that this site had little trade with the continent.

The main tombs of the Garou site 

 
 
 
 
 
 Hashihaka Kofun

A peculiar site 

 Although the site is said to be a large settlement, the remains of an inhabited settlement have not been found. All that can be seen today are ritual buildings, earthen mounds, ritual implements such as arcane discs and chicken-shaped wooden products, and large and small ditches (canals) protected by cypress sheet piles for distribution. Many scholars believe that the site was not a residential area, but rather a place for frequent gatherings of people and goods, and for rituals to Mount Miwa around the Hashihaka Kofun.
 In the Tsuji/Torii-mae area, a 2 x 3 m long  and a row of fences running east-west to the south of it have been found; in the Ota Minami Tobizuka area, the remains of a collapsed house have been found; and in the Makinochi Ietsura area, a small 1 x 1 m long house and a 2 x 2 m long building with full columns have been found. In addition, 17 dugout pillar buildings have been found in the Ota Meguri area, and pit dwelling remains have been found in the Higashida Kakinoki and Ota Tobizuka areas.
 According to Hironobu Ishino, this is "a large settlement site that suddenly appeared at the end of the 2nd century and suddenly disappeared in the middle of the 4th century".。

Excavation Report 

 Ishino Hironobu, Sekikawa Naokoh, "Garments," Sakurai City Board of Education, September 1976.
 Sekikawa, Naokoh and Matsunaga, Hiroaki, "Summary of Excavations at the Garoshi Site," The Archaeological Institute of Kashihara, 1984.
 Naokoh Sekikawa and Hiroaki Matsunaga, "An Overview of the Excavation of the Garoshi Archaeological Site," The Archaeological Institute of Kashihara, Nara Prefecture, 1985.
 "Report on the Excavation of the Garou Site", Sakurai Municipal Archaeological Center, Excavation Report 28, 2007.
 "Garou Ruins", Sakurai City Board of Education, Education Division, 1981.
 "Sakurai City Excavation Report by the National Treasury Subsidy in 2015", Sakurai Municipal Archaeological Heritage Excavation Report 46, 2017.

Characteristics of the site 

 The site dates from the late Yayoi period to the early Kofun period.
 It is one of the largest settlement sites of its time, covering a vast area.
 The Hashihaka Kofun, which has Tradition as the tomb of Himiko, is a huge 280-metre-long mound. It is thought that the two tombs were politically linked, as they were also built in other parts of Japan.
 Himiko, the queen of the Yamataikoku Kingdom, according to one theory.

 Kazuo Higo introduces the view of Shinya Kasai in the Taisho period.。According to it, Kasai assigned Himiko to Momosohime, and her brother Emperor Sujin to Emperor Sujin. The rationale for this is as follows.
 Emperor Sujin's year of death in the Chinese zodiac was Boshin, close to the year of Himiko's death.
 It is clear that Himiko was a kind of priestess from the legend of her marriage to the deity of Mt. Miwa, and from the story of Nichiya Hitosaku, Yaya Kamisaku.
She was the aunt of Emperor Sojin, but from the point of view of a foreigner (Chen Shou), she could be forgiven for being as wrong as his nephew and brother.

 Although there are many skeptics of this theory, some archaeologists believe that it is not unnatural for the Hashihaka Tomb to be Himiko's tomb, as the oldest giant anterior-posterior mound is the Hashihaka Tomb (the view of Shiraishi Taichiro and others).。On the other hand, the size of the posterior circle of the Hashihaka Kofun, which is about 160m in diameter, may not match the description of Himiko's tomb in the Wajinden. It is written in Wajinden that "Heimyako died in a large tomb, which is about a hundred paces away from the tomb", which means that the size of the tomb is about 30m in the case of the short ri used in Wajinden, which means that the Hashihaka Tomb is too big. Furthermore, the size of the burial mound was described in terms of diameter in the Wei Shi Wajin Den, so it is thought to be a round burial mound or similar. Therefore, there is a question mark over the use of the Hashihaka Tomb as the tomb of Himiko. (However, there is a theory that the front part of the tomb was additionally constructed in later times.)

 In 2013, more than 100 postholes were found in a building that is believed to have been constructed in the 3rd century. It is thought that the building was built and demolished many times.。
 Although pottery was brought in throughout the 3rd century, about 15% of the total excavated earthenware is made up of pottery brought in from Suruga, Owari, Ise, Omi, Hokuriku, San'in, Kibi and other areas, but there is little pottery from northern Kyushu. The proportion of ritual-related remains is about 30%, but there are very few bronze mirrors and swords, which indicate exchange with the continent. This suggests that at that time there was a local royal power in this area which had little to do with Kitakyushu or the continent.
 There are no Han mirrors, later Han mirrors or swords found at this site to prove that Himiko Cao Wei Wei and others interacted with the continent. In addition, no iron arrowheads were excavated. According to Sekikawa Naokoh, "According to the Book of Wei, Himiko frequently sent messengers to Wei, and from Wei also came messengers and soldiers, so there was active exchange with the peninsula and the continent. Therefore, the active exchange with the peninsula and Korea as shown in the Heian-period Japanese history has not been proven and the site is not the site of the Yamatai.。

The Royal Capital of the Yamato Kingdom 
Kaoru Terasawa, in his book "The Birth of the Yamato Kingdom: The Royal Capital, the Garou Site and its Kofun Tombs", lists six features and peculiarities of the Garou Site。

 It appeared suddenly at the beginning of the 3rd century. It is a very well planned settlement and large in size.
 The site is the largest in the Japanese archipelago and had a municipal function. The site was the largest in the Japanese archipelago and had a municipal function.
 There are few domestic utensils and civil engineering tools are conspicuous, and a huge canal was built and large-scale civil engineering works for city construction were carried out.
 Water-conducting facilities and ritual facilities are royal rituals. Royalty-related buildings. Arcuate designs originating from the royal tombs of Kibi, special vessel bases and jars.
 The Hashihaka Kofun, which was stylised on the edge of the habitation space, and the garnet-shaped posterior frontal burial mound that preceded it.
 Ironware production. (No ironware has been found at the Garoshi site).

In addition, there is a pottery with "Oichi" written in ink from the early Heian period, and this site is considered to correspond to the "Ohoichi" township described in "Wamyō Ruijushō". Kiki", it is known that the city had a municipal function until later times, and furthermore, the Emperor Suinin and Emperor Keiko's Shiki-no-mizukaki-no-miya, Emperor Suinin, and Tamaki-no-Hishiro-no-Miya, folklore are described as having existed.。

After saying this, Terasawa concluded, "There is no other huge settlement in the Japanese archipelago in the third century that has such a total of archaeological and philological features. Therefore, it is highly probable that the third-century site of Gengen was the city where the capital palace of the first kingship of the archipelago, called the Yamato Kingdom, was located".

Hironobu Ishino also argues that it was not a naturally occurring village but an artificially built city, based on the discovery of a large ditch and a ritual site with a seawall leading to the Yamato River, the unusually large number of pottery artifacts from outside the Kinki region, and the fact that at least one out of every five people at Gengen is estimated to have come from outside the Yamato region.。

The following remarks also reinforce the view that the site is the birthplace of the Yamato Kingship or the royal capital of the Yamato Kingship.

 In the surrounding area, there are also palaces such as Nagase Asakura Palace of Emperor Yūryaku in the 5th century, and Shiki (Isogi) Shima Omiya (Kinshiku) Palace of Kinmei in the 6th century.
 The Man'yoshu also contains many poems about the place name.

Birthplace of the anterior-posterior mound 

The Hashihaka Kofun located at the site is generally considered to be the beginning of the stylized Kofun system. Kaoru Terasawa considers the tombs belonging to the Garoushizuka tumulus that preceded the Hashihaka Kofun, such as the Garoushizuka tumulus, using the concept of "Garoushizuka-type post-frontal-round tumulus", and places them in the emergence-period tumulus。

See also 

 Yamato Kingship
 Yamatai
 Yamatai Honshu Theory
 Hashihaka Kofun

Annotations

References

Yamatai